Actinoptera mamulae is a species of tephritid or fruit flies in the genus Actinoptera of the family Tephritidae.

Distribution
Europe.

References

Tephritinae
Insects described in 1855
Diptera of Europe
Taxa named by Georg Ritter von Frauenfeld